Hackensack most commonly refers to the U.S. city of Hackensack, New Jersey, the county seat of Bergen County.

It may also refer to:

People
Hackensack people, a Native American tribe from the area now known as the Gateway Region of northeastern New Jersey, U.S.

Places
Hackensack, Minnesota, U.S.
Hackensack River, in New York and New Jersey, U.S.
Hackensack Township, New Jersey, a former township in Bergen County, New Jersey
Hackensack University Medical Center, a highly specialized tertiary-care hospital in Hackensack, New Jersey

Songs
"Hackensack", a song by Fountains of Wayne from the 2003 album Welcome Interstate Managers
"Hackensack", a cover on MTV Unplugged (Katy Perry EP), 2009
"Hackensack", a composition by Thelonious Monk (1917–1982)

See also